Deapara is a village that is located in Sreedharpur Union of Abhaynagar Upazila, Jessore District, Bangladesh.

References

Populated places in Khulna Division